Richard Edward Hayward (born 1954) is a former English first-class cricketer. Hayward was a left-handed batsman who bowled left-arm medium pace.

Early career
born 15 February 1954 at Ickenham, Middlesex, Hayward made his debut in county cricket for Buckinghamshire in the 1978 Minor Counties Championship against Hertfordshire. Hayward played ten Minor Counties matches for Buckinghamshire in the 1978 season. Hayward continued to represent Buckinghamshire in to the 1979 Minor Counties Championship.

During the 1979 season Hayward made his first-class debut for a Minor Counties side against the touring Indians. Also in the 1979 season, Hayward made his List-A debut for Minor Counties South against Gloucestershire in Group A of the 1979 Benson & Hedges Cup. Hayward played four matches for the South in the competition, the last of which came against Glamorgan. Additionally in the 1979 season, Hayward made his List-A debut for Buckinghamshire in the 1979 Gillette Cup against Suffolk.

In 1981 Hayward joined Hampshire, making his first-class debut for the county against the touring Sri Lankans, where on debut Hayward scored his maiden first-class century with a score of 101*. Hayward made his List-A debut for the county against Lancashire in the quarter-finals of the 1981 NatWest Trophy.

From 1981 to 1982 Hayward represented Hampshire in thirteen first-class matches, the last of which came against Surrey in the 1982 County Championship. In his thirteen first-class matches for the county, Hayward scored 454 runs at a batting average of 25.22, with one century and two half centuries and a high score of 101*. The same season Hayward played his final List-A match for Hampshire against Somerset in the John Player League. In his fourteen List-A matches for Hampshire, Hayward scored 155 runs at a batting average of 31.00, with a high score of 44*.

Move to New Zealand
After leaving Hampshire, Hayward rejoined Buckinghamshire, making his return debut against Shropshire and representing the county in 22 Minor Counties matches from 1983 to 1985, including the 1983 Minor Counties Championship Final, which Buckinghamshire lost to Hertfordshire won by 2 wickets.

In 1983 Hayward joined Central Districts in New Zealand where he made his first-class debut against Northern Districts. Hayward's List-A debut for Central Districts came against Northern Districts.

In the 1984 Benson and Hedges Cup, Hayward represented the Minor Counties once again, making his List-A debut for them against Lancashire and playing his final match for a combined Minor Counties side against Nottinghamshire. In the same season Hayward made his second and final List-A appearance for Buckinghamshire against Lancashire in the 1984 NatWest Trophy.

Brief stint with Somerset
In the 1985 English season Hayward joined Somerset where he made his first-class debut for the county against Gloucestershire. During the 1985 season, Hayward played nine first-class matches with his final first-class match for Somerset coming at the end of the 1985 season against former club Hampshire. In his nine first-class matches for Somerset, Hayward scored 278 runs at a batting average of 30.88, with one century and one half century and a high score of 100*. That same season Hayward made his List-A debut for Somerset against Warwickshire. Hayward played eight List-A matches for the county, with his final appearance for them coming against Middlesex.

End of career
In the 1985/86 New Zealand cricket season, Hayward returned to play a final season for Central Districts. During the season Hayward made eight first-class appearances, with his final appearance coming against Wellington and five List-A appearances, with his final appearance coming against Northern Districts. In his combined first-class appearances for Central Districts, Hayward played 27 first-class matches for Central Districts from 1983 to 1986, scoring 1,034 runs at a batting average of 27.21, with one century and six half centuries and a high score of	102. Between 1983 and 1986 Hayward represented the State in List-A cricket eleven times, including the final of the 1984/85 Shell Cup against Wellington Firebirds which Central Districts won by 8 wickets. In his 16 List-A matches for the State, Hayward scored 355 runs at a batting average of 25.35, with three half centuries and a high score of 63.

Hayward continued to represent Buckinghamshire in the Minor Counties Championship, with the last of his 51 matches coming against Shropshire in 1989.

In Hayward's overall first-class career he scored 1,766	runs at a batting average of 26.75, with three centuries and nine half centuries and a high score of 102. In the field, Hayward took 27 catches. In Hayward's overall List-A career he scored 889 runs at a batting average of 28.67, with five fifties and a high score of 78*. Hayward also took 2 wickets at a bowling average of 32.50.

After career
In September 2002, Hayward was appointed as Canterbury's Director of Coaching and Development. He is also a match referee. for New Zealand Cricket. In November 2019 he was made a life member of the Central Districts Cricket Association.

References

External links
Richard Hayward at Cricinfo
Richard Hayward at CricketArchive
Matches and detailed statistics for Richard Hayward

1954 births
Living people
People from Uxbridge
English cricketers
Buckinghamshire cricketers
Minor Counties cricketers
Hampshire cricketers
Central Districts cricketers
Somerset cricketers
English cricket coaches